The Leviathan gas field is a large natural gas field in the Mediterranean Sea off the coast of Israel,  south-west of the Tamar gas field. According to some commentators, the gas find has the potential to change Israel's foreign relations with neighboring countries, including Turkey, and Egypt. Together with the nearby Tamar gas field, the Leviathan field is seen as an opportunity for Israel to achieve energy independence in the Middle East.

As of 2017, even by conservative estimates, Leviathan holds enough gas to meet Israel's domestic needs for 40 years. The field began commercial production of gas on 31 December 2019.

History

The potential for a natural gas prospect at the Leviathan site was identified by geologist Eitan Aizenberg, co-founder of the small Israeli oil exploration company Ratio. To assist with exploring the prospect Ratio enlisted the cooperation of another Israeli firm, Delek, who then brought in Texas-based Noble Energy to the venture – with whom it had previously developed the small Mari-B offshore gas field in southern Israel under the Yam Tethys partnership.

The cost of drilling the exploration well was $92.5 million. The well was drilled by the Homer Ferrington rig.

While the gas discovery at -5170m was made in the Tamar sands layer which was already known to contain gas, the additional oil and gas potential exists in layers that have not been explored in the Levant basin. Noble has twice failed to reach the deeper layers due to technical challenges with drilling to the extreme depths involved. However, during drilling towards the intended target some gas was detected and as of 2012 Noble still had plans to explore those layers.

The Leviathan gas field was the second largest gas field in the Mediterranean Sea after the August 2015 discovery of the Zohr field off the coast of Egypt, only 6 km from Cyprus's Block 11. Chevron Corporation, which acquired Noble Energy in October 2020, operates Leviathan with a 39.66% working interest; Delek holds 22.67%; Avner Oil Exploration holds 22.67%; and Ratio Oil Exploration holds the remaining 15%.  In February 2014, Woodside Energy agreed to buy a 25% stake of the Leviathan field for up to US$2.55 billion. It was announced on 21 May 2014 that Woodside Energy pulled out of an agreement to take a stake worth up to $2.7 billion in Israel's flagship Leviathan gas project, as the group developing the field shifted focus to regional markets.

In the summer of 2014, Netherland, Sewell & Associates (NSAI) made an upward revision on the amount of gas reserves, giving a 2P value of 621 BCM. The expected year of production was stated to be 2017. In April, 2015, the Israel Ministry of Energy reported that it was working with NSAI and the Leviathan partners to understand the discrepancy between the NSAI revised estimate and the estimate provided by other analyses provided to the ministry, indicated a best estimate of only 16.5 tcf (470 BCM).

On 19 October 2015, Russian President Vladimir Putin and Israeli Prime Minister Benjamin Netanyahu agreed to allow major concessions for Gazprom to develop the Leviathan reserves.

On 19 February 2018, The partners in Israel’s Tamar and Leviathan natural gas fields signed $15 billion in deals to export natural gas to Egypt over 10 years. One accord calls for the sale of 3.5 BCM of natural gas annually from the Leviathan field, for a total of 32 BCM, estimating the sale from the Leviathan field to reach $7.5 billion. Regarding the deal, the Egyptian president, Abdel Fatah al-Sissi, declared about the project : "Has a lot of advantages for us (Egyptians). And I want people to be reassured". Yossi Abu, chief executive of Delek Drilling, said: "I think that the main thing is that Egypt is becoming the real gas hub of the region".

In September 2020, the owners of the field agreed to sell $190 million worth of natural gas to a power plant in Ramat Hovav.

Inovo BV controversy
Inovo BV, the Dutch corporation owned by Kamil Ekim Alptekin, claims to be the sole Turkish representative in Ratio Oil Exploration. Ratio has denied that it has any affiliation with Alptekin or Inovo BV, though BuzzFeed News has produced evidence documenting a relationship dating back to at least early 2016.

Technical description
Gas production is carried out by four wells connected by two 18-inch, 73-mile subsea tiebacks to a natural gas processing platform located 10 km offshore Dor, Israel. The processing platform has the capacity to handle up to 1.2 BCF of gas per day (12 BCM per year) and could be expanded to handle up to 2.1–2.4 BCF per day (21–24 BCM per year). Gas and condensate pipelines link the platform to an onshore reception station at Dor which is connected to the domestic Israeli gas and liquid fuels pipeline networks.

Rights dispute
The existence of the Leviathan gas fields poses several challenges to states in that area of the Eastern Mediterranean, in terms of cooperation between them, as well as for the wider Mediterranean energy context. After discovery of the Leviathan gas fields in 2010, Lebanon argued that the field extends into Lebanese waters. Lebanon’s Parliament Speaker Nabih Berri stated that Israel is "ignoring the fact that according to the maps the deposit extends into Lebanese waters," Agence France-Presse reported on June 9. Israeli Minister of National Infrastructures Uzi Landau responded "We will not hesitate to use our force and strength to protect not only the rule of law but the international maritime law," in an interview. In August 2010, Lebanon submitted to the United Nations its official view regarding the maritime border, indicating that it considered the Tamar and Leviathan gas fields to be outside Lebanese territory (though it indicated other prospective fields in the region may be within Lebanese territory). The US expressed support for the Lebanon proposal.

See also
Energy Triangle
Economy of Israel
Sarah and Myra – two Israeli offshore drilling licences
Block 12
List of natural gas fields

References

External links

Articles

Two Birds with One Pipeline, Gal Luft, Jan. 6, 2012.
Israel's Zero Gas Game, Gal Luft, Aug. 6, 2013.
Israel's Zero Gas Option: Take II, Gal Luft, March, 31 2014.

Natural gas fields in Israel